Adnane Aarbia (born 14 July 1983) is a Moroccan former road cyclist. He competed in the road race at the 2010 and 2011 UCI Road World Championships, but did not finish either year.

Major results

2007
 6th Grand Prix of Sharm el-Sheikh
2008
 4th Road race, National Road Championships
2009
 5th Road race, National Road Championships
2010
 6th Overall Tour of Libya
 6th GP Oued Eddahab, Les Challenges de la Marche Verte
 8th Trophée Princier, Challenge du Prince
 9th Grand Prix of Al Fatah
2012
 3rd Road race, National Road Championships
 Challenge des phosphates
5th Challenge Ben Guerir
7th Challenge Khouribga
8th Challenge Youssoufia
 10th Trophée Princier, Challenge du Prince
2013
 5th Road race, National Road Championships
2014
 Challenge du Prince
3rd Trophée Princier
7th Trophée de l'Anniversaire
 3rd GP Sakia El Hamra, Les Challenges de la Marche Verte
 5th Road race, National Road Championships
2015
 4th GP Oued Eddahab, Les Challenges de la Marche Verte
2016
 7th Trophée Princier, Challenge du Prince

References

External links

1983 births
Living people
Moroccan male cyclists
Sportspeople from Marrakesh